Hollis Kimball "Bud" Sheely (November 26, 1920 – October 17, 1985) was an American Major League Baseball catcher. He appeared in 101 games over 2 seasons, all for the Chicago White Sox, from July 1951 through 1953.

The son of Earl Sheely, a first baseman who played in over 1,200 MLB games over nine seasons (1921–27; 1929; 1931), Bud Sheely was born in Spokane, Washington, and attended Saint Mary's College of California. He was signed by the Boston Red Sox as an amateur free agent in 1941.

Before the 1946 season, he was released by the Red Sox and signed as a free agent with the Pittsburgh Pirates. He was returned by Pittsburgh to the Hollywood Stars of the Pacific Coast League prior to 1947, and obtained by the White Sox when Chicago signed a new working agreement with the Stars.

Sheely's 44 MLB hits included 39 singles. Only five went for extra bases, all doubles.  His pro career ended after the 1955 season, which he spent in the Pacific Coast League.

See also
List of second-generation Major League Baseball players

External links

1920 births
1985 deaths
Baseball players from Spokane, Washington
Beaumont Exporters players
Canton Terriers players
Chicago White Sox players
Greensboro Red Sox players
Hollywood Stars players
Major League Baseball catchers
Oakland Oaks (baseball) players
Sacramento Solons players
Saint Mary's Gaels baseball players
Spokane Indians players
Seattle Rainiers players
Vancouver Capilanos players